The 1996–97 Football League (known as the Nationwide Football League for sponsorship reasons) was the 98th completed season of The Football League.

Bolton Wanderers returned to the Premiership in superb fashion, hitting 100 goals and taking 98 points. Barnsley were promoted to the top flight for the first time in their history, while Crystal Palace returned after a two-year absence by winning the play-offs.

The decline of Oldham Athletic continued, falling into the third tier for the first time in 23 years, and just three years after being in the Premiership. Grimsby Town and Southend United joined them in relegation to the Second Division.

Bury won their second consecutive promotion, taking the Second Division title, Stockport County joined them in automatic promotion, and play-off winners Crewe Alexandra completed the trio moving up.

Going down were Peterborough United, Shrewsbury Town, Rotherham United and Notts County. County had been in the top division just five years earlier.

Wigan Athletic won the Third Division title on goals scored from Fulham. Carlisle United and play-off winners Northampton Town also won promotion to the Second Division.

Hereford United were the first club for four years to be relegated to the Conference after finishing bottom. Conference champions Macclesfield Town replaced Hereford (two years after Town had been denied entry to the Third Division). In December, Brighton & Hove Albion were 11 points adrift at the bottom of the Third Division, having had 2 points deducted for a pitch invasion. However a draw in their final game at Hereford kept Brighton in the league, and sent United down.

Final league tables and results 

The tables below are reproduced here in the exact form that they can be found at The Rec.Sport.Soccer Statistics Foundation website, with home and away statistics separated. Play-off results are from the same website.

First Division 
One season after being relegated from the Premier League, Bolton Wanderers finished champions of Division One after leading the table virtually all season, finishing with 100 goals and 98 points in their final season at Burnden Park before relocating to the new all-seater Reebok Stadium. Barnsley finished runners-up and reached the top flight for the first time in their 101-year history. Wolves, who were beaten to automatic promotion by Barnsley, lost to Crystal Palace in the semi-finals of the playoffs, their second playoff defeat in three seasons, while Sheffield United overcame Ipswich Town in the other semi-final. Palace sealed promotion after two years away from the Premier League when midfielder David Hopkin scored with almost the last kick of the game.

A year after almost being relegated to Division Two, Portsmouth made strong progress in their second full season under the management of Terry Fenwick and just missed out on the playoffs. Port Vale, who finished eighth, enjoyed one of the highest final positions in their history, although eighth place was not high enough for playoff qualification and the chance of top flight football for the first time in the club's history. Vale's local rivals Stoke City finished 12th in their final season at the 119-year-old Victoria Ground before moving to the new Britannia Stadium. Manchester City spent the first half of the season battling at the wrong end of the table before the mid-season appointment of Frank Clark sparked a turnaround in fortunes and lifted them to 14th in the final table. 

Southend United's six-year spell in the league's second tier came to an end as they finished bottom of Division One, with relegation quickly being followed by the dismissal of manager Ronnie Whelan. Oldham Athletic were next to go, their second relegation in four seasons being confirmed soon after the departure of manager Graeme Sharp. Alan Buckley, sacked mid-season by West Bromwich Albion, returned to Grimsby Town for his second spell as manager but was unable to keep the Mariners up, the battle against relegation being lost on the final day of the season.

Play-offs

Top scorers

Results

Locations

Second Division 
Bury's upturn in fortunes continued as they followed their promotion from Division Three with promotion from Division Two, finishing champions of the division to clinch a place in Division One. Stockport County, another club more familiar with the lower two divisions of the league, sealed promotion as runners-up at the end of an exciting season which also saw them reach the semi-finals of the League Cup. 

Crewe Alexandra finally reached the league's second tier for the first time in their history, triumphing over Brentford in the Division Two playoff final after falling at the semi-final stages during the previous two seasons. Bristol City and Luton Town were the beaten semi-finalists. Notts County finished bottom of the table to make it three relegations in six seasons, condemning them to fourth tier football only a few years after they had been in the top flight. Rotherham United went down in second from bottom place, followed shortly afterwards by Shrewsbury Town and Peterborough United. York City enjoyed a repeat of the 1995-96 season, beginning the campaign by eliminating Premier League opposition from the League Cup (this time Everton rather than Manchester United) and finished one place above the relegation zone, although this time safety was achieved before the final day of the season.

Play-offs

Top scorers

Results

Locations

Third Division 

In their second season under the management of John Deehan and ownership of ambitious chairman Dave Whelan, Wigan finished champions of Division Three, with striker Graeme Jones being the league's top scorer with 31 goals. Carlisle United finished runners-up behind them on goal difference, one season after relegation, and Fulham clinched the final automatic promotion place in their final season under the chairmanship of Jimmy Hill. The West London club was then taken over by Harrods owner Mohammed al Fayed. The final promotion place was won by Northampton Town, who ended their seven-year stay in the league's basement division by defeating Swansea City with John Frain goal in the last minute of extra time in the playoff final. 

16th placed Leyton Orient made a move for 47-year-old former England goalkeeper Peter Shilton in December, with the veteran shot-stopper making nine league appearances and becoming the first player in English football to make a total of 1,000 league appearances before leaving the Brisbane Road side at the end of the season. 

Brighton, deep in debt and faced with being left homeless through the sale of the Goldstone Ground, looked doomed by Christmas as they trailed the rest of the Division Three sides by a long distance. However, an incredible improvement in form during the second half of the season made survival appear like a realistic target by April, and they went into the final game of the season off the bottom of the table against a Hereford United side who were their hosts on the final day. Brighton need at least a draw to survive, while victory would keep Hereford in the league. A Kerry Mayo own goal put the Edgar Street side ahead and Brighton looked set to go down to the Conference a mere 14 years after being FA Cup finalists and side in the old First Division, before equalizing late on in the game through new signing Robbie Rienelt, securing their Division Three survival and ending Hereford's 25-year stay in the league. Brighton were then faced with several weeks of uncertainty about their future as the search for a new home continued, ending when a groundsharing deal was agreed with Gillingham in Kent. 

Coming up from the Conference were Macclesfield Town, who had overturned a wide lead by Kidderminster Harriers during the second half of the season to clinch the Conference title on the final day of the season and claim the Football League status which they had been denied two years earlier when their Moss Rose stadium failed to meet the league's capacity requirements. The necessary work had since taken place, ensuring that the Cheshire side did not suffer the same disappointment again.

Play-offs

Top scorers

Locations

Results

See also
1996–97 in English football

References

 
English Football League seasons
2